Ronald Charles Robertson-Swann OAM (born 1941, Sydney), is an Australian sculptor, best known for his controversial abstract public sculpture Vault (1980) located in Melbourne, he also known for his sculpture Leviathan Play (1985), located in Brisbane.

Art career 
Vault has been described as being in the Anthony Caro style, which he adopted after studying at Saint Martin's School of Art, London, in the 1960s. He studied under Lyndon Dadswell and was an assistant to Henry Moore. He is Head of Sculpture at the National Art School and is the artistic adviser to the popular annual exhibition Sculpture by the Sea. He was a founding member of the Visual Arts Board of the Australia Council and has won numerous awards including the Comalco Invitational Sculpture Award, the Transfeld Prize and the Alice Prize.

Graeme Sturgeon, the pre-eminent Australian sculpture historian and critic, described Robertson-Swann in 1980 as "the most consistent of the Classic Formalist, that is, the one most concerned to produce a sculpture which, while obviously of its era, transcends considerations of style in search of a timeless sense of rightness."

Notable Artworks 

 Vault – Melbourne (1980)
 Leviathan Play – Brisbane (1985)

Artwork Gallery

References

External links 
 Charles Nodrum Gallery 
 Australian Center for Contemporary Art
 UNSW Art Collection, Sculpture Walk

Further reading
Wallis, Geoffrey J., Peril in the Square: The sculpture that challenged a city, Indra Publishing, Melbourne, 2004. 

20th-century Australian sculptors
Living people
1941 births
Alumni of Saint Martin's School of Art
21st-century Australian sculptors